The Louisville Grays were a 19th-century United States baseball team and charter member of the National League, based in Louisville, Kentucky. They played two seasons, 1876 and 1877, and compiled a record of 65–61.  Their home games were at the Louisville Baseball Park. The Grays were owned by businessman Walter Newman Haldeman, owner and publisher of the Louisville Courier-Journal newspaper.

Overview 

The Grays were undone by Major League Baseball's first gambling scandal. The team was in first place in August 1877, then suddenly lost seven games and tied one against the Boston Red Stockings and Hartford Dark Blues. Boston ended up winning the pennant, seven games ahead of the second-place Grays. A Courier-Journal story questioning the team's conduct was written by John Haldeman, the owner's son.

Team president Charles Chase received two anonymous telegrams. One noted that gamblers were favoring the less talented Hartford team in an upcoming series. The second telegram predicted Louisville would throw the next game versus Hartford on August 21. The Grays committed a number of suspicious errors and lost that game 7–0. League president William Hulbert investigated and ordered players to authorize Western Union to release all telegrams sent or received during the 1877 season. All players complied except shortstop Bill Craver, the team's captain.

The telegrams indicated that pitcher Jim Devlin, left fielder George Hall, and utility player Al Nichols intentionally lost games in exchange for money. No direct evidence was found implicating Craver. All four were banned from baseball for life, Craver for refusing to comply with the investigation.

Devlin pitched every inning for the 1877 Grays, leading the league in games and innings pitched. Hall played every inning in left field; he was a good batter, and was the 1876 home run leader with five. The original St. Louis Brown Stockings had signed Devlin and Hall for 1878 and went out of business with the Grays after the investigation.

See also
 Louisville Grays all-time roster
 1876 Louisville Grays season
 1877 Louisville Grays season
 1877 Louisville Grays scandal
 Sports in Louisville, Kentucky

References

 Cash, Jon David.  Before They Were Cardinals: Major-League Baseball in Nineteenth-Century St. Louis.  2002, U. of Missouri Press.
 Cook, William.  The Louisville Grays Scandal of 1877.  2005, paperback, McFarland and Co.
 Ginsburg, Daniel.  The Fix Is In: A History of Baseball Gambling and Game Fixing Scandals.  2004, paperback, McFarland and Co.

External links

 Team index at Baseball Reference

 
Defunct baseball teams in Kentucky
Defunct Major League Baseball teams
Baseball teams established in 1876
Sports clubs disestablished in 1877
1876 establishments in Kentucky